Temple B'nai Israel is a synagogue in Tupelo, Mississippi, established in 1939,  composed of Jews, ranging from Reform Judaism to Orthodox Judaism.

History

Tupelo, Mississippi, had only 20 Jewish residents at the beginning of the Great Depression, out of 20,000 total residents.

Temple B'nai Israel in Tupelo was established on August 24, 1939, with Sol Weiner as its first President. The congregation first met in Tupelo City Hall. In 1945, the congregation added a holy ark, and was given its first Torah by the Vine Street Temple in Nashville, Tennessee. It later rented space on South Spring Street above the Fooks' Chevrolet dealership. In 1949, a student rabbi from Hebrew Union College in Cincinnati, Ohio, conducted  Temple services for the high holidays.  In 1953, it moved to space over Biggs Furniture Store. 

A synagogue building was dedicated on September 1, 1957, with then-Mayor James Ballard giving the remarks. The building was funded by Manny Davis, an Okolona sportswear manufacturing businessman, local banks, manufacturing companies, and other businesses, the local community, Jews from across the nation, and 41 percent by Gentiles.

Leadership and congregants
Due to its modest size, the Temple does not have a full-time rabbi, and instead uses a lay leader. Maury Stein was a lay leader of the congregation in the 1960s. Marc Perler has served as a lay leader of the synagogue. In 2011, Mississippi State University Bulldog broadcaster Jack Cristil was the lay leader of the congregation.

As of 1955 Maurice Stein (who owned a dress shop on Main Street) was president of the synagogue, Len Shane and Linda Levy were later president of the temple, and as of 2020 Leslie Mart was president of Temple B’Nai Israel. Ron Baker serves as its Director of Religious Education. Gloria Lenhoff, who has Williams Syndrome (which among other things produces an aptitude for music), has served as the cantor of the Temple. Alan Mark Bank, Tupelo's 2010 Outstanding Citizen of the Year, was an active member of the Temple. In 2020, about 35 families were active in the synagogue.

References

External links
Temple B'nai Israel homepage

Synagogues in Mississippi
Synagogues completed in 1957

Buildings and structures in Tupelo, Mississippi
Tupelo, Mississippi
1939 establishments in Mississippi